Zenner is a surname. Notable people with the surname include:

Alain Zenner (born 1946), Belgian politician
Christin Zenner (born 1991), German swimmer
Daren Zenner (born 1971), American boxer
Zach Zenner (born 1991), American football player